In North American broadcast television frequencies, channel 1 was a former broadcast (over-the-air) television channel which was removed from service in 1948.

During the experimental era of TV operation, Channel 1 was moved around the lower VHF spectrum repeatedly, with the entire band displaced upward at one point due to an early 40 MHz allocation for the FM broadcast band. After FM was moved to its current frequencies in 1946, TV Channel 1's last assigned band was 44 to 50 MHz. This allocation was short-lived.

Land Mobile Radio and television broadcasters shared the same frequencies until 1948, which caused interference. This shared allocation was eventually found to be unworkable, so the FCC reallocated the Channel 1 frequencies for public safety and land mobile use and assigned TV channels 2–13 exclusively to broadcasters. Aside from the shared frequency issue, this part of the VHF band was (and to some extent still is) prone to higher levels of radio-frequency interference (RFI) than even Channel 2 (System M).

As Mexico signed on its first station in 1950 and Canada's first station went on-air in 1952, the historical Channel 1 (System M) is exclusively a U.S. allocation artifact.

History 
Channel 1 was allocated at 44–50 MHz between 1937 and 1940. Visual and aural carrier frequencies within the channel fluctuated with changes in overall TV broadcast standards prior to the establishment of permanent standards by the National Television Systems Committee.

In 1940, the FCC reassigned 42–50 MHz to the FM broadcast band. Television's channel 1 frequency range was moved to 50–56 MHz (see table below). Experimental television stations in New York, Chicago, and Los Angeles were affected.<ref>"Threat to Television Is Feared in Frequency Modulation Order", New York Times, May 21, 1940, p. 23. "Gives Du Mont Right to Television Here", New York Times, July 21, 1940, p. 28.</ref>

Commercial TV allocations were made by the Federal Communications Commission (FCC) under the NTSC system on July 1, 1941.  Channel 1 was located at 50–56 MHz, with visual carrier at 51.25 MHz and aural carrier at 55.75 MHz. At the same time, the spectrum from 42 to 50 MHz was allocated to FM radio. Several commercial and experimental television stations operated on the 50–56 MHz Channel 1 between 1941 and 1946, including one station, WNBT (now WNBC, channel 4) in New York City, which had a full commercial operating license.

In the first postwar allocation in the spring of 1946, Channel 1 was moved back to 44–50 MHz, with visual at 45.25 MHz and aural at 49.75 MHz. FM was moved to its current 88–108 MHz band. But WNBT and all other existing stations were moved to other channels, because the final Channel 1 was reserved for low-power community stations covering a limited area. While a handful of construction permits were issued for this final version of Channel 1, no station ever actually broadcast on it before it was removed from use in 1948.

When the FCC initially allocated broadcast television frequencies, channel 1 was logically the first channel. These U.S. TV stations originally broadcast on the 50–56 MHz channel 1:
 W2XBS/WNBT (today's WNBC), New York City (1941–1946), reassigned in 1946 to channel 4;
 W6XAO/KTSL (today's KCBS-TV), Los Angeles, reassigned post-war to channel 2;
 W9XZV Chicago, Zenith's experimental station, billed as the first all-electric TV station in 1939. Reassigned post-war to Channel 2, it broadcast an early form of monochrome pay-TV in 1951 as K2XBS Phonevision and conducted early color television experiments before ultimately going dark in 1953. Its transmitters were donated to WTTW (PBS 11 Chicago) and its channel 2 assignment was taken by CBS O&O WBBM-TV.
 KARO, Riverside, California; never began broadcasting, no current VHF allocation;
 WSBE, South Bend, Indiana; never began broadcasting on channel 1, but was reallocated to UHF channel 34 in the 1952 revised channel allocation table, where it went on the air as WSBT-TV that year.  As part of a consolidation of the Elkhart and South Bend communities into a single television market, WSBT-TV was moved in 1958 to UHF channel 22, where it remains as a digital CBS affiliate today; channel 34 became the home of PBS member station WNIT. No full-service VHF TV allocations were made available to South Bend due to its proximity to Chicago, making the city a UHF island.
 
By September 1945, additional stations temporarily granted construction permits to operate on channel 1 included: 
 W8XCT (WLW) Cincinnati, Ohio ultimately built on channel 4 as commercial station WLWT, later moved to channel 5.
 W9RUI Iowa City, Iowa held an unbuilt construction permit, and additionally given a channel 12 assignment.
 W8XGZ Charleston, West Virginia, licensed to a chemical company, also held a channel one construction permit; there is no indication the stations ever got on the air.See also list of experimental television stations for additional channel one pioneers.''

As a virtual channel, however, KAXT-CD in San Francisco (broadcasting on physical UHF channel 22) was assigned virtual channel 1 in July 2009, becoming the first American station to be assigned virtual channel 1 via the digital television PSIP standard, which shows the channel as such on a digital television set. KAXT-CD's physical broadcasts on UHF channel 22 cause no interference for Channel 1 physically. XHDF-TDT and all Azteca Uno stations broadcast on Virtual 1.

Community television 
In 1946, prior to cable TV and the invention of public-access television channels,  the FCC decided to reserve channel 1 for low-power Community television stations, and moved existing channel 1 stations to higher frequencies. Community television stations covered smaller cities and were allowed to use less radiated power. None of these stations were built before the FCC imposed a freeze on all television station construction permits in mid-1948, and removed the channel one allocations.

A shared (non-primary) allocation 
From 1945 to 1948 TV stations in the U.S. shared Channel 1 and other channels with fixed and mobile services. The FCC decided in 1948 that a primary (non-shared) allocation of the VHF radio spectrum was needed for television broadcasting. Except for selected VHF frequencies in Alaska and Hawaii (and some overseas territories) the FCC-administered VHF band is primarily allocated for television broadcasting to this day.

The FCC in May 1948 formally changed the rules on TV band allocations based on propagation knowledge gained during the era of shared-user allocations. The 44–50 MHz band used by Channel 1 was replaced by lower-power narrowband users.

Channel 1 was reassigned to fixed and mobile services (44–50 MHz) in order to end their former shared use of other VHF TV frequencies. Rather than renumber the TV channel table, it was decided to merely remove Channel 1 from the table.

Cable television
On cable television systems, channel 1 was optionally used by some providers in between channels 4 and 5 at the frequencies of 72–78 MHz (moving channel 5 and 6 allocations up by 2 MHz; however, this would prevent channels 5 and 6 from being viewed on non-cable-ready television sets). Channel 1, where available, has also been mapped to 99 (frequency range 114–120 MHz) on some cable boxes.

Modern allocations 43–50 MHz
As of September 2000, the Federal Spectrum Use of the band (which is regulated by the NTIA and not the FCC) was as follows:

43.69–46.6 Non-Military Land Mobile Radio (LMR):Primarily used by Federal agencies for mutual aid response with local communities. Military LMR: Used by the military services for tactical and training operations on a non-interference basis. (Band is otherwise non-government exclusive).
46.6–47 Govt. FIXED MOBILE Allocation: Non-Military LMR: Extensive use of this band is for contingency response to various national disasters. Others uses are for national resources management, law enforcement, tornado tracking, and various meteorological research support.  Military LMR: This band is used primarily for tactical and training operations by U.S. military units for combat net radio operations that provide command and control for combat, combat support, and combat service support units. Frequencies also used for air-to-ground communications for military close air support requirements as well as some other tactical air-ground and air-air communications.
47–49.6 Experimental:Used for experimental research to observe and measure currents in harbor areas in support of vessel safety. Military LMR: Used by the military services for tactical and training operations on a non-interference basis. (Band is otherwise non-government exclusive).
49.6–50 Govt. FIXED MOBILE Allocation: Non-Military LMR: This band is used extensively to support contingencies or ecological emergencies, some public safety requirements, MARS system, and air-quality measurements. Experimental: Research is performed in various regions of the atmosphere as well as experimental development of portable space orbital debris ground radars. Military LMR: This band is used primarily for tactical and training operations by U.S. military units for combat net radio operations that provide command and control for combat, combat support, and combat service support units. Frequencies also used for air-to-ground communications for military close air support requirements as well as some other tactical air-ground and air-air communications.

FCC (NON-Federal) allocations for the band:
Primarily Land Mobile use from 43-46.6.
46.61-46.89 is used by older cordless phone base stations. The handsets use the 49.61 - 49.89 range for transmitting to the base unit.
47.0-49.60 is used by LMR and then the cordless phone range. Early experiments with meteor scatter one way messaging was in the 49 - 50 range back in the early 1990s but it no longer exists due to reliable and cheaper satellite communications.

There is also a conflict with the de facto intermediate frequency for system M television, where receiver tuners shift and flip the incoming signal onto 41.25 MHz (analogue audio) and 45.75 MHz (analogue video) after the initial RF amplifier. This standard was adopted due to image frequency problems when UHF television broadcasting initially struggled to life in 1952.

Any receivers capable of tuning VHF TV 1, by necessity, operated on a lower intermediate frequency as 45.75 MHz video IF would overlap the incoming signal at 44-50 MHz.

Channel 1 in other NTSC-using countries
Canada did not start regular television broadcasts until after the U.S. had decommissioned Channel 1 (44–50 MHz) for television use; CBFT and CBLT signed on in 1952. This TV channel was never used in Latin America, South Korea and the Philippines excluding Japan as TV broadcasting did not start in these areas until the 1950s.

Japanese public broadcaster NHK General TV broadcast on Channel 1 in Tokyo and other cities. The Japanese Channel 1 was assigned to the frequency 90 to 96 MHz, just above the Japanese FM band which is 76 to 90 MHz. Frequencies corresponding to Japan's channel 1 through 3 (90–108 MHz) are used primarily for FM radio broadcasting (88–108 MHz) outside Japan and correspond to cable 95–97 in North America. With the advent of digital television, these frequencies are being vacated by TV broadcasters and allocated to "wide FM" broadcasters, relocating from mediumwave AM to an extended FM band above 90 MHz.

The following commercial television stations operated on channel 1 on analog:
 Hokkaido Broadcasting (HBC) in Sapporo, Hokkaido
 Aomori Broadcasting Corporation (RAB) in Aomori, Aomori Prefecture
 Tohoku Broadcasting Company (TBC) in Sendai, Miyagi Prefecture
 Tokai Television Broadcasting (THK) in Nagoya, Aichi Prefecture
 Kitanihon Broadcasting (KNB) in Toyama, Toyama Prefecture
 Shikoku Broadcasting (JRT) in Tokushima, Tokushima Prefecture
 Nihonkai Television (NKT) in Tottori, Tottori Prefecture (also serving Matsue, Shimane Prefecture)
 Kyushu Asahi Broadcasting (KBC) in Fukuoka, Fukuoka Prefecture
 Minaminihon Broadcasting (MBC) in Kagoshima, Kagoshima Prefecture
On digital television, their virtual channel number is 1 for historical reasons.

References

External links 
 What ever happened to Channel 1? -  J. W. Reiser, based on a Radio-Electronics article of the same name by David A. Ferre
 Why is there no Channel One on television? - Cecil Adams
 What became of Channel 1? - Jeff Miller
 What Happened to Channel 1? - Snopes.com

Television in the United States
01
Television channel articles with incorrect naming style